William Thomas Lowndes (c. 1798 – 31 July 1843), English bibliographer, was born about 1798, the son of a London bookseller.

His principal work, The Bibliographer’s Manual of English Literature—the first systematic work of the kind—was published in four volumes in 1834. It took Lowndes fourteen years to compile, but, despite its merits, brought him neither fame nor money. "For years Lowndes was the national British bibliography." It is regarded as a "bibliographical classic" although "pleasurably more scattershot than systematic."

Lowndes, reduced to poverty, subsequently became cataloguer to Henry George Bohn, the bookseller and publisher. In 1839 he published the first parts of The British Librarian, designed to supplement his early manual, but owing to failing health did not complete the work.

References

Further reading

 The Bibliographer's Manual of English Literature, Volume 6: Appendix, Bell & Daldy, 1865.
 
 Francesco Cordasco, "William Lowndes and The Bibliographer's Manual: A Retrospective Essay," in: Lowndes, The Bibliographer's Manual (1967 reprint), 1:v-xii.
 David A. Stoker, "William Thomas Lowndes," in: Nineteenth-Century British Book-Collectors and Bibliographers, ed. William Baker and Kenneth Womack (1997), pp. 265–70.

External links
 The Bibliographer’s Manual of English Literature, Vol. 1, William Pickering, 1834

1798 births
1843 deaths
English bibliographers